Wangtang is a village in Jianggu Town  of the county-level city of Sihui, in the prefecture-level city of Zhaoqing, Guangdong Province, China. It is located in the southern part of Jianggu Town, some 4 km from the town center, and has a population of 2570.

The village is served by Guangdong Provincial Highway 260 (S260).

See also
 List of villages in China

References
Notes

Bibliography

Villages in China